The 2008–09 National Division One was the 22nd full season of rugby union within the second tier of the English league system, currently known as the RFU Championship. Leeds Carnegie joined National Division One, having been relegated from the Guinness Premiership after the 2007–08 season. Otley and Manchester were promoted from the 2007–08 National Division Two.

Leeds Carnegie won a quick promotion back to the Guinness Premiership, while five teams were relegated to the newly named 2009–10 National League 1: Esher, Sedgley Park, Newbury, Otley and Manchester.  The reason for the large number of teams being relegated was due to the league being restructured the next season from 16 to 12 teams as the new RFU Championship was introduced.

Participating teams 

Notes

Table

Notes

Points were awarded as follows:
 4 points for a win
 2 points for a draw
 0 points for a loss
 1 bonus point (BP) for losing by 7 points or less
 1 bonus point (BT) for scoring 4 tries or more in a match

Results

Round 1

Round 2

Round 3

Round 4

Round 5

Round 6

Round 7

Round 8

Round 9

Round 10

Round 11

Round 12

Round 13

Round 14

Round 15 

Postponed. Game rescheduled to 19 April 2009.

Round 16 

Postponed. Game rescheduled to 2 May 2009.

Postponed. Game rescheduled to 28 February 2009.

Round 17

Round 18

Round 19 

Postponed. Game rescheduled to 21 March 2009.

Postponed. Game rescheduled to 21 March 2009.

Postponed. Game rescheduled to 1 April 2009.

Round 20 

Postponed. Game rescheduled to 28 February 2009.

Postponed. Game rescheduled to 22 March 2009.

Postponed. Game rescheduled to 21 March 2009.

Postponed. Game rescheduled to 9 May 2009.

Postponed. Game rescheduled to 28 February 2009.

Postponed. Game rescheduled to 8 April 2009.

Round 21

Round 22

Round 23 

Postponed. Game rescheduled to 18 April 2009.

Postponed. Game rescheduled to 18 April 2009.

Postponed. Game rescheduled to 29 April 2009.

Postponed. Game rescheduled to 21 February 2009.

Postponed. Game rescheduled to 19 April 2009.

Postponed. Game rescheduled to 15 April 2009.

Round 24

Round 16 & Round 20 Rescheduled Games 

Game rescheduled from 28 February 2009.

Game rescheduled from 13 December 2008.

Game rescheduled from 28 February 2009.

Round 25

Round 26

Round 19, 20 & 23 Rescheduled Games 

Game rescheduled from 3 January 2009.

Game rescheduled from 3 January 2009.  Game was also a double header - league match and EDF National Cup semi final.

Game rescheduled from 10 January 2009.

Game rescheduled from 14 February 2009.

Game rescheduled from 10 January 2009.

Round 27

Round 19 Rescheduled Game 

Game rescheduled from 3 January 2009.

Round 28

Round 20 Rescheduled Game 

Game rescheduled from 11 January 2009. Game also switched from Grove Park to Headingley in Leeds as Manchester did not have floodlights.

Round 29

Round 15 & 23 Rescheduled Games 

Game rescheduled from 15 February 2009.

Game rescheduled from 14 February 2009.

Game rescheduled from 14 February 2009.

Game rescheduled from 15 February 2009.

Game rescheduled from 7 December 2008.

Round 30

Rounds 16, 20 & 23 Rescheduled Games 

Game rescheduled from 14 February 2009.

Game rescheduled from 13 December 2008.

Game rescheduled from 10 January 2009 but would be cancelled by Otley due to the club having 8 players on county duty for Yorkshire.  The FDR gave Moseley a 20–0, 5 point win by default.

Total Season Attendances 

Notes

Individual statistics 

 Note that points scorers includes tries as well as conversions, penalties and drop goals.

Top points scorers

Top try scorers

Season records

Team
Largest home win — 90 pts 
95 - 5 Nottingham at home to Otley on 8 March 2009
Largest away win — 104 pts
104 - 0 Leeds Carnegie away to Manchester on 8 April 2009
Most points scored — 104 pts
104 - 0 Leeds Carnegie away to Manchester on 8 April 2009
Most tries in a match — 16
Leeds Carnegie away to Manchester on 8 April 2009
Most conversions in a match — 12 (x2)
Nottingham at home to Otley on 8 March 2009
Leeds Carnegie away to Manchester on 8 April 2009
Most penalties in a match — 7 
Rotherham Titans at home to Exeter Chiefs on 11 April 2009
Most drop goals in a match — 3
Cornish Pirates at home to Plymouth Albion on 12 April 2009

Player
Most points in a match — 29
 Tim Taylor for Nottingham at home to Otley on 8 March 2009
Most tries in a match — 5
 Tom Brown for London Welsh at home to Manchester on 28 March 2009
Most conversions in a match — 12
 Jason Strange for Leeds Carnegie away to Manchester on 8 April 2009
Most penalties in a match —  7
 Michael Whitehead for Rotherham Titans at home to Exeter Chiefs on 11 April 2009
Most drop goals in a match — 3
 Rhys Jones for Cornish Pirates at home to Plymouth Albion on 12 April 2009

Attendances

Highest — 7,345 
Exeter Chiefs at home to Cornish Pirates on 27 December 2008
Lowest — 283 
Manchester at home to Esher on 31 January 2009
Highest Average Attendance — 4,599	
Exeter Chiefs
Lowest Average Attendance — 473
Manchester

See also
 English rugby union system

External links
national1.co.uk

References

2008–09 in English rugby union leagues
2008-09